Monkman & Seagull's Genius Adventures is a BBC documentary series presented by Eric Monkman and Bobby Seagull, a duo who met as rivals on the quiz programme University Challenge and became friends, coauthors and TV and radio show cohosts. The show is a follow on from their 2018 series Monkman & Seagull's Genius Guide to Britain, it is a road trip around the United Kingdom, time-travelling through a key 150 years from the Industrial Revolution to the Victorian era. The show aired in 2020 with a voiceover supplied by Simon Callow.

Episodes

Reception

Sean O'Grady in The Independent praised the fun nature of the first episode, enjoyed the technical explanations and found Monkman & Seagull's joy at discovery and enthusiasm for enlightenment "extremely infectious".

Joel Golby in The Guardian suggested that a flaw in the show is that the segments where Monkman & Seagull are learning about something don't come across well, because the viewer knows that they are intelligent and already know the information. He suggested that the show needs "someone happy to play the fool", to ask questions and let Monkman & Seagull do the explaining instead. Golby praised the duos' chemistry, specifically singling out the segments filmed in the car saying "These are so comfortable, and so different from the rest of the show, that you suspect the production team neglected to tell the pair that the cameras were rolling, and instead captured raw magic and asked for permission to broadcast it afterwards."

References

External links

2020 British television series debuts
2020 British television series endings
BBC television documentaries about science
Documentary television series about technology
Industrial history of the United Kingdom
Works about the history of industries